The 2000 Giro d'Italia was the 83rd edition of the Giro d'Italia, one of cycling's Grand Tours. The Giro began in Rome, with a Prologue individual time trial on 13 May, and Stage 10 occurred on 23 May with a stage to Padua. The race finished in Milan on 4 June.

Prologue
13 May 2000 — Rome,  (ITT)

Stage 1
14 May 2000 — Rome to Terracina,

Stage 2
15 May 2000 — Terracina to Maddaloni,

Stage 3
16 May 2000 — Paestum to Scalea,

Stage 4
17 May 2000 — Scalea to Matera,

Stage 5
18 May 2000 — Matera to Peschici,

Stage 6
19 May 2000 — Peschici to Vasto,

Stage 7
20 May 2000 — Vasto to Teramo,

Stage 8
21 May 2000 — Corinaldo to Prato,

Stage 9
22 May 2000 — Prato to Abetone,

Stage 10
23 May 2000 — San Marcello Pistoiese to Padua,

References

2000 Giro d'Italia
Giro d'Italia stages